The 2004 Haarlem Baseball Week was an international baseball competition held at the Pim Mulier Stadium in Haarlem, the Netherlands from July 23 to August 1, 2004. It was the 22nd edition of the tournament and featured teams from Chinese Taipei, Cuba, Italy, Japan, the Netherlands and the United States.

In the end the team from the Netherlands won the tournament for the first time.

Group stage

Standings

 Chinese Taipei is the official IBAF designation for the team representing the state officially referred to as the Republic of China, more commonly known as Taiwan. (See also political status of Taiwan for details.)
 The United States were represented by a semi-pro unaffiliated baseball team  from Reno, Nevada named the Reno Astros.

Game results

 Regarding a benefit game, the results didn't affect the standings.

Final

Final standings

Tournament awards

External links
Official Website
Game Results

References

2004 in baseball